United Nations Security Council Resolution 2580, adopted by acclamation at a closed meeting on June 8, 2021, having considered the question of the recommendation for the appointment of the Secretary-General of the United Nations, the Council recommended to the General Assembly that Mr. António Guterres be appointed for a second term of office from January 1, 2022, to December 31, 2026.

Guterres' election was uncontested and nations approved of his decision immediately.

See also
 List of United Nations Security Council Resolutions 2501 to 2600 (2019–2021)
 United Nations Security Council Resolution 1358 (2001)
 United Nations Security Council Resolution 1987 (2011)

References

External links
Text of the Resolution at undocs.org 

 2580
 2580
June 2021 events